Dorset & Wilts 1 South is an English Rugby Union league, forming part of the South West Division, for clubs primarily based in Dorset, sitting at tier 8 of the English rugby union system. Originally a single league, Dorset & Wilts 1 split into north and south regional divisions in 2004. Teams based in Berkshire participated until 2001 when they left to join the Buckinghamshire & Oxon leagues.

Promoted teams tend to move up to Southern Counties South, while relegated generally teams drop to Dorset & Wilts 2 South.  Only 1st XV sides can be promoted into Southern Counties South, while any side can fall to Dorset & Wilts 2 South.  Each year all 1st XV sides in the division also take part in the RFU Senior Vase – a level 8 national competition – provided they are members of the Dorset & Wilts RFU.

2021–22

Dorset Dockers (2nd in 2019-20) and East Dorset (11th in Dorset & Wilts 2 South in 2019-20) merged to form East Dorset Dockers for season 2021-22.

2020–21
Due to the COVID-19 pandemic, the 2020–21 season was cancelled.

2019–20

2018–19

2017–18

2016–17
Bournemouth III
Dorchester (relegated from Southern Counties South)
East Dorset
Lytchett Minster
New Milton & District II
North Dorset II
Oakmedians
Salisbury II
Sherborne II
Swanage & Wareham II
Weymouth & Portland (promoted from Dorset & Wilts 2 South)
Wimborne II
Yeovil (promoted from Dorset & Wilts 2 South)

2015–16

The 2015–16 Dorset & Wilts 1 South consisted of twelve teams; nine based in Dorset, two in south Wiltshire and one from Somerset. The season started on 12 September 2015 and ended on 23 April 2016.

Eight of the twelve teams participated in last season's competition. The 2014-15 champions, Dorset Dockers were promoted to Southern Counties South while Yeovil were relegated to Dorset & Wilts 2 South and Westbury to Dorset & Wilts 2 North.

2014–15
Blandford
Bournemouth II
Dorset Dockers 
Frome II
Ivel Barbarians
Lytchett Minster 	
North Dorset II
Oakmeadians
Sherborne II	
Warminster
Westbury	
Wimborne II

2012–13
Blandford
Bournemouth II
Bridport
Ivel Barbarians	
North Dorset II
Oakmeadians II
Salisbury II
Sherborne II	
Swanage & Wareham II
Warminster
Westbury	
Wimborne II

Original teams
When league rugby began in 1987 this division (known as Berks/Dorset/Wilts 1) contained the following teams from Berkshire, Dorset and Wiltshire:

Aldermaston 
Dorchester 
Devizes 
Hungerford 
Marlborough 
Royal Wootton Bassett 
R.E.M.E. 
Sherborne 
Swanage & Wareham 
Weymouth

Dorset & Wilts 1 South honours

Berks/Dorset/Wilts 1 (1987–1993)

Originally Dorset & Wilts 1 North and Dorset & Wilts 1 South were combined in a single division known as Berks/Dorset/Wilts 1, involving clubs based in Berkshire, Dorset and Wiltshire.  It was a tier 8 league with promotion to Southern Counties and relegation to Berks/Dorset/Wilts 2.

Berks/Dorset/Wilts 1 (1993–1996)

The creation of National League 5 South for the 1993–94 season meant that Berks/Dorset/Wilts 1 dropped to become a tier 9 league.  Promotion continued to Southern Counties and relegation to Berks/Dorset/Wilts 2.

Berks/Dorset/Wilts 1 (1996–2000)

The cancellation of National League 5 South at the end of the 1995–96 season meant that Berks/Dorset/Wilts 1  reverted to being a tier 8 league.  Further restructuring meant that promotion was now to Southern Counties South, while relegation continued to Berks/Dorset/Wilts 2.

Dorset & Wilts 1 (2000–2004)

At the end of the 1999–00 season the division became known as Dorset & Wilts 1 following the departure of Berkshire clubs to join the Bucks & Oxon leagues.  It remained a tier 8 league with promotion to Southern Counties South and relegation to either Dorset & Wilts 2 North or Dorset & Wilts 2 South (both formerly part of Berks/Dorset/Wilts 2).

Dorset & Wilts 1 South (2004–2009)

Ahead of the 2004–05 season, local league restructuring saw Dorset & Wilts 1 split into two tier 8 regional divisions: Dorset & Wilts 1 North and Dorset & Wilts 1 South.  Promotion continued to Southern Counties South, while relegation was now to Dorset & Wilts 2 South.

Dorset & Wilts 1 South (2009–present)

Despite widespread restructuring by the RFU at the end of the 2008–09 season, Dorset & Wilts 1 South remained a tier 8 league, with promotion continuing to Southern Counties South and relegation to Dorset & Wilts 2 South.

Number of league titles

Blandford (3)
Dorchester (3) 
Ivel Barbarians (3)
Bracknell (2)
Bournemouth II (2)
Sherborne (2) 
Swanage & Wareham (2) 
Swindon (2)
Weymouth & Portland (2)
Bridport (1)
Devizes (1)
Dorchester II (1)
Dorset Dockers (1)
Frome (1) 
Royal Wootton Bassett (1)
Swanage & Wareham II (1)
Swindon (1)
Trowbridge (1)
Westbury  
Wimborne II (1)
Yeovil (1)

Notes

See also 
 South West Division RFU
 Dorset & Wilts RFU
 English rugby union system
 Rugby union in England

References 

Rugby union leagues in England
Rugby union in Dorset
Rugby union in Wiltshire
Sports leagues established in 2004
2004 establishments in England